Gaetano Varcasia (6 September 1959 – 10 November 2014) was an Italian actor and voice actor.

Biography
Varcasia began his career in 1983. He had played key parts on stage and had even served as a director. He also had minor roles as a television actor, usually making at least one appearance on a TV series. He was more or less known as a voice dubber. He was the official Italian voice of Mickey Mouse from 1988 to 1995 and also dubbed characters from American television shows which include Tyrion Lannister from Game of Thrones, Carlton Banks from The Fresh Prince of Bel-Air, Ted Buckland from Scrubs, Saul Goodman from Breaking Bad and Chris Taub from House.

Varcasia was also known for dubbing characters from films. These include The Missing Link in Monsters vs. Aliens as well as the TV series and The Fallen in Transformers: Revenge of the Fallen. Some of the actors Varcasia dubbed included Jackie Earle Haley, Robert Downey Jr., David Schwimmer, Peter Dinklage, Sam Lloyd, Christian Slater and many more.

Death
Varcasia died of cancer on 10 November 2014. He was 55 years old.

Filmography

Cinema
Le quattro porte del deserto (2003)

Television
Club Sandwich (1985)
Una lepre con la faccia di bambino (1988)
Stazione di servizio (1989)
Il maresciallo Rocca (1996)
Lui e lei (1999)
San Paolo (2000)
Carabinieri (2002)
Camera Café (2003)
La squadra (2006)
Il Capo dei Capi (2007)
Distretto di Polizia (2001–2007)
RIS Delitti Imperfetti (2008)
Crimini bianchi (2008)

Dubbing roles

Animation
Mickey Mouse in All Disney Productions (1988-1995)
The Missing Link in Monsters vs. Aliens
The Missing Link in Monsters vs Aliens: The Series
Uncle Henry in Legends of Oz: Dorothy's Return
Marc Bolan in House of Rock
Ari Folman in Waltz with Bashir

Live action
Tyrion Lannister in Game of Thrones (seasons 1-4)
Saul Goodman in Breaking Bad
Carlton Banks in The Fresh Prince of Bel-Air
Ted Buckland in Scrubs
Phil Dunphy in Modern Family (seasons 1-5)
Chris Taub in House
Jesse Vasquez in Beverly Hills, 90210
Nick George in Dirty Sexy Money
Ronnie J. McGorvey in Little Children
George Noyce in Shutter Island
Willie Loomis in Dark Shadows
Gareth Mallory in Skyfall
Baxter in The Shaggy Dog
The Fallen in Transformers: Revenge of the Fallen
Paul in Pulp Fiction
Soap in Lock, Stock and Two Smoking Barrels
Heinrich Himmler in Downfall
Nathan Ford in Leverage (seasons 1-4)
Thomas Wilson in The Good Shepherd
Peter in Death at a Funeral
James Potter in Harry Potter and the Goblet of Fire
James Potter in Harry Potter and the Deathly Hallows – Part 2
John Druitt in Sanctuary
Great Goblin in The Hobbit: An Unexpected Journey
James Whistler in Prison Break

Video games
Ghost in Destiny

References

External links
 
 

1959 births
2014 deaths
Male actors from Rome
Deaths from cancer in Lazio
Italian male voice actors
Italian male stage actors
Italian male television actors
Italian male film actors
Italian theatre directors
20th-century Italian male actors
21st-century Italian male actors